Nicolás Adolfo Guggiana Riera (born May 29, 1985) is an Argentine actor.

Biography 
Nicolás Riera is the son of Osvaldo Guggiana and María Laura Riera and has two siblings, Mariano and Jazmín, who is a writer. He completed his primary and secondary studies at Colegio Marín, in San Isidro, Buenos Aires Province, Argentina. In his youth he played rugby in the San Fernando club team, he is also a lover of surfing and skiing. Nicolás Riera practices Jiu Jitsu, a sport that combines mixed martial arts. He practices amateur football frequently. He is a fan of the UFC.

Personal life 
Nicolás Riera  is very close with his Casi Ángeles co–stars Mariana Espósito, Gastón Dalmau, Juan Pedro Lanzani, Rocío Igarzábal and María Eugenia Suárez. During the recordings of Casi Ángeles Nicolás Riera was in a relationship with his co–star María Eugenia Suárez.

From 2011 to 2012, Nicolás Riera was in a relationship with Silvina Escudero.

From 2012 to 2014, Nicolás Riera was in a relationship with his co–star Rocío Igarzábal.

From June 2019 to 2021, Nicolás Riera was in a relationship with the actress Giulia Gabetta.

Career 
Nicolás Riera participated in the 2002 series Kachorra. In 2006 Nicolás Riera participated in the children's and youth novel Alma Pirata. In 2006 Nicolás Riera participated in the sit-com Casados con Hijos. At the end of 2006 he was selected to play the character of Juan "Tacho" Morales in the television series Casi Ángeles. Nicolás Riera participated in the theatrical adaptations of the series and those of the band Teen Angels. In January 2012 to 2013 he played the character of Lucas Pedroso on the television series Dulce Amor. In 2013 and 2014 Nicolás Riera also starred in the docu-reality Viajar es mi destino in Panama and Ecuador. From the end of 2013 to 2014 Together with Catherine Fulop, Rocío Igarzábal and Gabriel Corrado he starred in the television series Taxxi, amores cruzados broadcast by Telefe. In cinema Nicolás Riera starred with Rocío Igarzábal and Gastón Soffritti the film El desafío. This film was shot during 2014, and premiered on January 29, 2015. In 2016 Nicolás Riera joined the cast of the Pol-ka television series, Los ricos no piden permiso. In 2017 he starred in the series Cartoneros, where he plays El Dandyr. In the series he is accompanied by Luis Luque, Jenny Williams, Micaela Vázquez and Silvia Kutica. In 2017 he joined the cast of the Pol-ka television series, Las Estrellas (telenovela) broadcast by Canal 13 with Marcela Kloosterboer, Violeta Urtizberea, Celeste Cid,
Gonzalo Valenzuela, Luciano Castro, Nicolás Francella, Natalie Pérez and Justina Bustos. The series premiered on May 29, 2017 and ended on January 23, 2018. In 2018 he was part of the main cast of the series Millennials broadcast by Net TV with Noelia Marzol, Laura Laprida, Matías Mayer, Juan Manuel Guilera and Johanna Francella.

Filmography

Television

Theater

Television Programs

Movies

Discography

Awards and nominations

References

External links 
 
 

1985 births
21st-century Argentine male actors
21st-century Argentine male singers
Argentine male stage actors
Argentine male telenovela actors
Argentine male television actors
Living people
Male actors from Buenos Aires
Bailando por un Sueño (Argentine TV series) participants